Egil Danielsen  (9 November 1933 – 29 July 2019) was a Norwegian javelin thrower. He competed at the 1956 and 1960 Olympics and won the gold medal in 1956. Danielsen, who used an old-type wooden javelin, did poorly in the 1956 final, which was led by his Polish friend Janusz Sidło. Trying to help Danielsen, Sidło lent him his modern steel javelin, and Michel Macquet gave him a cup of strong coffee. Danielsen set a new world record at 85.71 m and won the gold medal. He could never reproduce that throw.  Danielsen was selected Norwegian Sportsperson of the Year in 1956.

Danielsen finished tenth at the 1954 European Championships and won a silver medal in 1958, behind Sidło. He became Norwegian champion in 1953–1957.

Danielsen was an avid cross-country skier before changing to javelin throw. He took fencing lessons from a top Norwegian fencer to improve his flexibility, reflexes and the use of right arm. He retired after the 1960 Olympics and focused on his family and work at the Hamar Fire Brigade. In the 2000s he was a minor political candidate for the Norwegian Pensioner Party.

References

1933 births
2019 deaths
Athletes (track and field) at the 1956 Summer Olympics
Athletes (track and field) at the 1960 Summer Olympics
Olympic athletes of Norway
Olympic gold medalists for Norway
Sportspeople from Hamar
Norwegian male javelin throwers
European Athletics Championships medalists
Medalists at the 1956 Summer Olympics
Olympic gold medalists in athletics (track and field)